Amanze Ikenna Egekeze (born December 3, 1995) is a Nigerian-American professional basketball player who plays for Kataja of the Korisliiga. He also played for the Nigerian national team. He is the son of Gilbert and Lize Egekeze, who are natives of Nigeria.

Early life and college career
Egekeze played for Huntley High School, where he was the 2014 Northwest Herald Boys Basketball Player of the Year. Egekeze played on three Class 4A regional champions.

Egekeze competed in college basketball for Belmont, where he scored 1,348 career points. As a senior, he was the second-leading scorer (16.8 per game) and rebounder (5.0 per game) for the Bruins. He was named to the First-team All-Ohio Valley Conference.

Professional career
On July 13, 2018, Egekeze signed with the Yokohama B-Corsairs of the Japanese B.League. During the 2018–19 season, he also played for the Ryukyu Golden Kings and the Niigata Albirex BB from the same league.

On September 1, 2019, Egekeze signed with the Greek club PAOK. The 2019–20 season was complicated for PAOK.
. Egekeze and PAOK also participated in the Champions League where they ended at the second to last position of the D group, composed of 8 teams, with 5 wins and 9 losses, thus, not qualifying for the next round.

In June 2020, Egekeze signed with the French club BC Gries-Oberhoffen. Egekeze and the BCGO participated in the Leaders Cup where they ended at the bottom of the D group, composed of 3 teams, with 1 win and 3 losses, thus, not qualifying for the next round.

On June 30, 2021, Egekeze signed with Dutch club Donar of the BNXT League. He helped Donar win the Dutch Cup.

On August 3, 2022, Egekeze signed a one-year contract with Kataja of the Korisliiga.

National team career
In December 2020, Egekeze became a member of the Nigerian national basketball team, and played with the team in the qualifiers for AfroBasket 2021.

Statistics

College statistics

|-
| style="text-align:left;"| 2014–15
| style="text-align:left;"| Belmont
| 33 || 23 || 20.0 ||.404  ||.338  || .837|| 3.2 || 0.7 ||0.8  ||0.5 || 5.4
|-
| style="text-align:left;"| 2015–16
| style="text-align:left;"| Belmont
| 31 || 31 || 22.7 || .539 || .422 || .768|| 3.4 ||0.7  || 0.4 || 0.4 || 9.0
|-
| style="text-align:left;"| 2016–17
| style="text-align:left;"| Belmont
| 30 || 29 || 27.2 || .487 || .384 || .843|| 5.5 ||0.9  || 0.4 || 0.8 || 11.3
|-
| style="text-align:left;"| 2017–18
| style="text-align:left;"| Belmont
| 33 ||33 || 34.5 || .505 || .425 || .802|| 6.2 ||0.9 || 0.6 || 0.2 ||16.8
|-

Career statistics

|-
| align="left" | 2018–19
| align="left" | Yokohama
|15||15||33.6 ||.417 || .280|| .804 || 6.4 || 1.6 || 0.9 ||0.7  ||13.9
|-
| align="left" | 2018–19
| align="left" |Ryukyu
|4||4||38.2||.429||.421||.714 ||7.2 ||1.8 ||1.0 ||0.2  ||12.2
|-
| align="left" | 2018–19
| align="left" | Niigata
|2||2||31.5||.613||.467||.857 ||7.0 ||1.0||0.5 ||0.5 ||25.5
|-
| align="left" | 2019–20
| align="left" | PAOK
|20||-||12.9||.635||.360||.727 ||2.1 ||0.5||0.1 ||0.1 ||3.8
|-
| align="left" | 2020–21
| align="left" | BCGO
|-||-||-||-||-||-||-||-||-||-||-
|-

References

External links
Belmont Bruins bio

1995 births
Living people
American expatriate basketball people in France
American expatriate basketball people in Greece
American expatriate basketball people in Japan
American men's basketball players
American sportspeople of Nigerian descent
Basketball players from Illinois
Belmont Bruins men's basketball players
Donar (basketball club) players
Nigerian expatriate basketball people in France
Nigerian expatriate basketball people in Japan
Nigerian men's basketball players
Niigata Albirex BB players
P.A.O.K. BC players
People from McHenry County, Illinois
Power forwards (basketball)
Ryukyu Golden Kings players
Sportspeople from the Chicago metropolitan area
Yokohama B-Corsairs players